The Lilium Jet  is a prototype German electric vertical take-off and landing (eVTOL) electrically powered airplane designed by Lilium GmbH. A seven-seat production version is planned.

History
Initial design studies included forward-folding wings, so that the aircraft could be piloted as a VTOL and recharge in only few hours from a standard 240 V electrical outlet. A first half-scale demonstrator, Falcon, flew in 2015. The  unmanned first flight of the two-seat Eagle full size prototype was on 20 April 2017 at the Mindelheim-Mattsies  airfield, Bavaria, Germany.

The five-seat unmanned Lilium Jet was flight tested at Oberpfaffenhofen airfield near Munich. It first flew in May 2019. It managed 25° banked turns, high ascent/descent rates like in operations, hover turns and sideward translations. Electrical, fan and flap failures were mitigated by the electrical and flight control systems.

The first prototype was destroyed by fire during maintenance on 27 February 2020. A second partially-constructed prototype was undamaged. A further unfinished prototype was abandoned, and work begun on a seven-seat version, with projected first flight in 2022.

Design
The Lilium Jet uses multiple relatively small ducted propellers driven by electric motors to provide lift during take-off and landing, as well as thrust during the cruise phase. Lilium says that it refers to the propulsion system as a "jet" because the propellers are enclosed in nacelles. The production Lilium Jet is intended to accommodate six passengers and one pilot. It is powered by 36 electric motors, six on each of the two front canards and twelve on each rear wing. The motors are installed above twelve tiltable rear flaps. The drive-carrying flaps pivot downwards for vertical launch. At the transition to the horizontal position, forward thrust is generated. This is claimed to be significantly more economical than a conventional rotorcraft, however the propulsion configuration generates very high disc loading and power-delivery requirements significantly exceeding the leading competitive eVTOL designs.

Lilium invested in Ionblox for its silicon-dominant anode battery technology, which it believes offers uniquely high energy and power density (12C with 3.8 kW/kG at 50% charge and 3.0 kW/kG at 30%) needed for hover and take-off phases, even at low charge levels. 

Specifications

Usage
The Lilium GmbH plans to found an air taxi service for urban air mobility and Advanced Air Mobility with the Lilium Jet. The company expects that pilots will be needed for around 10 years until autonomous flights can take over.

Award
In October 2019 the Lilium five-seater Jet received a Red Dot Award: Design Concept for “Best of the Best”.

See also
 Air taxi
 Flying car (aircraft)

References

External links
 Official website
 Independent Website / eVTOL News

Proposed aircraft of Germany
Canard aircraft
Electric aircraft
Urban air mobility
EVTOL aircraft
Aircraft first flown in 2017
Aircraft first flown in 2019